The Annona Chalk is a geologic formation in Arkansas, Texas, Louisiana, and Oklahoma. It preserves fossils dating back to the Cretaceous period. The formation is a hard, thick-bedded to massive, slightly fossiliferous chalk. It weathers white, but is blue-gray when freshly exposed. The unit is commercially mined for cement. Fossils in the Annona Chalk include coelenterates, echinoderms, annelids, bivalves, gastropods, cephalopods, and some vertebrate traces. The beds range in thickness, up to over 100 feet in depth in some areas (such as at White Cliffs)., but thins to the east and is only a few feet thick north of Columbus, Arkansas and is completely missing to the east. The break between the Annona Formation and the Ozan Formation appears to be sharp with a few tubular borings up to a foot long extending down from the Annona in to the Ozan.

Exposures

Paleofauna

Ammonites
Baculites
B. crickmayi
B. taylorensis
Didymoceras
Didymoceratoides
D. binodosum
D. clardyi
Nostoceras
N. (Nostoceras) danei
N. (Nostoceras) monotuberculatum
N. (Nostoceras) plerucostatum
N. (Nostoceras) pulcher
Oxybeloceras
O. crassum
Pachydiscus
Placenticeras

Ostracods

Alatacythere
A. ponderosana
Bairdoppilata
B. rotunda
Brachycythere
B. ovata
Bythocypris
B. windhami
Cythere
Cytheris
C. austinensis
C. caudata
C. communis
C. filicosta
C. paraustinensis
Cytherelloidea
C. crafti
C. tollettensis
Cytheropteron
C. blakei
Haplocytheridea
H. bruceclarki
H. globosa
H. micropunctata
H. plummeri
Krithe
K. cushmani
Loxoconcha
L. fletcheri
Monoceratina
M. montuosa
M. pedata
Orthonotacythere
O. hannai
Paracypris
Phacorhabdots
P. texanus
Veenia
V. ozanana

See also

 List of fossiliferous stratigraphic units in Arkansas
 Paleontology in Arkansas

References

 
 Notes on the Annona Chalk, Norman L. Thomas and Elmer M. Rice, Journal of Paleontology, Vol. 6, No. 4 (Dec., 1932), pp. 319–329

Cretaceous Arkansas
Cretaceous geology of Texas